The third and current HMS Argyll is a Type 23 Duke-class frigate. She is currently the oldest serving Type 23 frigate in the Royal Navy. Like all of her class she is named after a British dukedom, in this case that of Argyll. HMS Argyll was laid down in March 1987 by Yarrow Shipbuilders at Glasgow, and launched in 1989 by Lady Wendy Levene, sponsored by the Worshipful Company of Paviors. She was commissioned in May 1991. Argyll is currently based at HMNB Devonport.

Argyll is the first Type 23 to be fitted with the new Sea Ceptor missile system.

She had been scheduled to be withdrawn from service in 2023. However, in 2021 in a written answer provided to the House of Commons Select Defence Committee, the First Sea Lord, Admiral Tony Radakin, suggested that older Type 23 frigates would be retained in service longer than anticipated in order to ensure that total escort numbers did not fall below 17 ships (6 destroyers and 11 frigates) and start to rise above 19 escorts starting in 2026. If confirmed, this would mean that the older Type 23 frigates, such as Argyll, would have their anticipated service lives extended significantly.

Operational history

1991–2000
On 26 March 1994, Argyll's Lynx helicopter crashed into the sea off Andros Island in the West Indies while practising for an air display. The crew escaped and were rescued but the aircraft was unrecoverable after sinking in 5,000ft of water.

During those operations, Argyll acted as the West African Guardship and remained off West Africa until September 2000. Throughout this period Argyll operated with her Lynx HMA Mk 8 helicopter. The Lynx undertook daily patrols and searches. The Lynx was instrumental to the successful completion of Operation Barras. During her deployment, the helicopter was scrambled to search for a missing passenger ferry. The aircraft's crew quickly located the vessel and provided escort for Argyll. Argyll saved fifty-eight lives from drowning. She was relieved by her sister-ship  in September. During this incident Argyll, assisted by HMS Ocean, laid the foundation for the Iron Duke Community School. This is a school for orphans in Freetown.

2001–2010
In 2001, while in the Bay of Biscay, Argyll suffered an electrical fire that was quickly put out by the ship's damage control team, with the ship suffering only minimal damage.

Argyll completed a six-month deployment to the Persian Gulf protecting two oil platforms, working with the American, Australian and Iraqi Navies from February to August 2005. The ship made a short visit to Boulogne, then to its home port of Inveraray and finally to Liverpool, before undergoing Operational Sea Trials.

They completed their operation in November of the same year.

In October 2007 Argyll returned to the Persian Gulf to take over from her sister-ship, .

Thursday 3 April 2008 saw more than 500 friends and relatives welcome HMS Argyll as she returned to her home at Devonport after a deployment lasting six months in the Northern Persian Gulf. This was Argylls second Gulf deployment to Combined Task Force (CTF) 150 in three years. This deployment included one patrol which lasted 52 days from January to March 2008. HMS Argyll was also at the 'Meet Your Navy' exhibition at HMNB Portsmouth 2008.

6 May 2008 saw the crew return to Argyll, with the crew bidding their commanding officer of seven months, Commander Gavin Pritchard, a fond farewell. Pritchard was succeeded by Commander Peter Olive. Argyll was then to engage in a period of trials and training before entering a period of maintenance in June.

11 May 2008 saw the Trans-Atlantic solo yacht race in Plymouth Sound started by the ceremonial cannon aboard Argyll. Dame Ellen MacArthur also attended the start of the race and Rear Admiral Richard Ibbotson, head of the Flag Officer Sea Training organisation, was also on board Argyll.

On 21 July 2008 Argyll led the parade of tall ships out of Liverpool ahead of the Tall Ships Race starting 23 July.

On 18 February 2009, Argyll sailed from Devonport as part of the Taurus 09 deployment under Commander UK Amphibious Task Group, Commodore Peter Hudson, She was joined on this deployment by Landing Platform Dock , as Hudson's flagship, Landing Platform Helicopter (LPH) , Type 23 frigate  and four ships of the Royal Fleet Auxiliary. Argyll returned to Devonport on 17 April from this deployment.

In early October 2010, Argyll and her crew arrived in Plymouth last week after an 11-month refit which included 290,000-man-hours spent on modifications, upgrades and improvements." She has received a new command system, upgrades to Sea Wolf, the Mod1 4.5-inch (114mm) gun, and mounts for new small calibre guns. She was also given new boat-launching equipment. "The refit included the replacing of two of the vessel's four diesel generators and one of her gas turbine engines." Her ventilation system has been improved. "Along with fresh paint on the upper decks she has been coated below the waterline with a special paint to prevent the build-up of sea life which would slow the ship. This also makes her more fuel-efficient." HMS Argyll was the first Type 23 frigate to undergo a second major refit.

From 2011

On Sunday 22 January 2012 it was announced that Argyll was part of a six-ship convoy which sailed through the Strait of Hormuz alongside French and United States Navy vessels, during a diplomatic dispute with Iran. In a period after this she engaged in Exercise 'Goalkeeper' whilst still in the Middle East.

On 30 June 2012, Armed Forces Day, she fired the salute in Plymouth as part of a steampast alongside , the Earl of Wessex was in attendance alongside the First Sea Lord.

In 2013, she served a seven-month deployment to the Atlantic, having visited South Africa. She also engaged in counter-narcotics work in the Eastern Pacific by travelling around Cape Horn and headed back to her home port via the Panama Canal.

In March 2014, she accidentally fired a test (unarmed) torpedo whilst training at Devonport, there were no injuries and minimal damage.

On 30 June 2014, she arrived in Hamilton, Bermuda for a three-day visit as part of her deployment to the North Atlantic and Caribbean.

She arrived in Baltimore, Maryland, US on 11 September 2014 to participate in ceremonies commemorating the 200th anniversary of the Star Spangled Banner.

On Thursday 25 September 2014, she arrived in Veracruz.

On 6 October 2014, HMS Argyll visited George Town, Grand Cayman, after having been on counter-narcotics deployment in August 2014 as part of Operation Martillo.
From 9 to 13 October 2014 HMS Argyll paid an official visit to the Dominican Republic during the course of which her flight deck hosted the baptism of Stefania Rozsa, daughter of the British Ambassador.
On 18 October 2014, she arrived in Bermuda to provide assistance in the aftermath of Hurricane Gonzalo.

In 2014, a Lynx from Argyll identified a suspicious yacht in the Caribbean Sea, and a detachment of the U.S. Coast Guard operating from Argyll seized $16 million worth of cocaine found on the yacht. The group had seized an even larger shipment earlier on the same deployment.

In 2015, Argyll underwent an extended Life Extension (LIFEX) refit in Devonport; she returned to sea in February 2017 with a new principal weapon system, Sea Ceptor, and numerous modifications and alterations to her accommodation and working spaces. Argyll acted as the trials vessel for Sea Ceptor prior to resuming her operational duties and it was announced in September 2017 that she had undertaken the first firings of the new system earlier in the summer off the west coast of Scotland.

In 2017, it was announced that Argyll would be sent to join military exercises in the Asia Pacific with the Five Power Defence Arrangements partners and also the Japanese Maritime Self Defence Force. Part of her mission is "to continue the pressure campaign on North Korea".

On 11 March 2019, Argyll rescued a 27-strong crew from a burning container vessel Grande America 150 miles off the coast of France.

On 15 March 2019 the ship returned to HMNB Devonport after a nine-month deployment to Southeast Asia.

On 11 September 2019 it demonstrated the use of an autonomous PAC24 unmanned surface vehicle, a modified version of the boat the ship already carries, at the Defence and Security Equipment International 2019 exhibition. Also involved in the demonstration was an additional autonomous boat: the MAST-13.

Related images

Affiliations
HMS Argyll is affiliated with:
 His Grace, The Duke of Argyll
 The Argyll and Sutherland Highlanders, 5th Battalion Royal Regiment of Scotland
 No. 47 Squadron RAF
 Argyll and Bute District Council

 City of Glasgow
 Worshipful Company of Paviors
 Plymouth Argyle F.C.
 Lady Levene, the ship's sponsor
  RNR
 Royal Naval Club, Argyll
 Royal Naval Association Stirling
 TS Argyll – Irvine & District Sea Cadets
 City of London Sea Cadets
 Mount Kelly, Devon
 Dollar Academy, Clackmannanshire
 High School of Glasgow
 Argyll Ward, Derriford Hospital

In July 2017, GB Railfreight named a Class 66 locomotive Argyll in honour of HMS Argyll in a ceremony at Devonport.

References

External links

 

Frigates of the United Kingdom
History of Argyll and Bute
Ships built on the River Clyde
1989 ships
Type 23 frigates of the Royal Navy